"Love Don't Cost A Dime" is a song by Nigerian singer-songwriter Magixx, on his eponymous debut EP Magixx. It is the first song on the EP, released officially released on 24 September 2021 by Mavin Records. It song was written by Magixx, and produced by Lomon. A new version of the song titled "Love Don't Cost A Dime (Re-Up)" featuring Nigerian singer Ayra Starr, released as his single in 2022.

Background
After signing a record, and music publishing deal with Mavin Records on 23 September 2021, a day before the release of his eponymous project Magixx. "Love Don't Cost A Dime" was one of the songs he wrote. The production was handled by Lomon, at Mavin Studios in Lekki, Lagos. During an interview with Bambo Ojo, a music author for The Culture Custodian. Magixx discussed the song's creation, and said: "The song was just a vibe. It wasn’t really inspired by something that I was feeling at that moment, it was just based on past experiences." On 16 October 2021, Glitch Africa released a live performance of "Love Don't Cost A Dime".

Reception and commercial performance
Music critics for The Native, classified "Love Don't Cost A Dime", as the Biggest Hit Potential on the eponymous extended play, during their first impressions of the project. In a review for Pulse Nigeria, music critic, Motolani Alake, wrote: "Love Don't Cost A Dime as the best song on the EP". On 25 October 2021, the song debuted at number 22 on TurnTable Top 50 chart, its also debuted on Turntable Top 50 Airplay Chart at number 46, on 23 October 2021 and peaked at number 15, on 27 October 2021. The  song debuted at number 30 on Billboard U.S. Afrobeats Songs chart, and it was included on Culture Custodian, list of 5 Songs you need on your playlist in September 2021.

On 12 February 2022, "Love Don't Cost A Dime (Re-Up)", featuring Ayra Starr, debuted at 27 on TurnTable Top 50 chart, and peaked at number 8, on 28 March 2022. On 22 February 2022, it debuted on Turntable Top 50 Airplay Chart at number 15 and peaked at number 4, on 29 March 2022. It debuted at number 41 on Turntable Top 50 Streaming Songs on 2 March 2022, and peaked at number 14 on 23 March 2022. It debuted on Turntable Top Triller chart Nigeria, at number 14 on 23 February 2022. The song debuted on the UK Afrobeats Singles Chart, at number 20, on 13 March 2022. As of April 2022, "Love Don't Cost A Dime (Re-Up)" has received 4.6 million streams on Boomplay.

On 11 July 2022, it debuted on the newly launched TurnTable Top 100, an expansion of the Top 50 chart, at number 33. On 14 July 2022, following the initial launch of the Nigeria Top Afro-R&B Songs chart, "Love Don't Cost a Dime (Re-Up)" debuted at number 1. On 13 July 2022, it debuted on the newly launched TurnTable Top Streaming Songs, an expansion of the Top 50 Streaming Songs, at number 37, and debuted on the newly launched TurnTable Top Radio Songs, an expansion of the Top 50 Airplay, at number 33.

Music video
The music video for "Love Don't Cost A Dime" was directed by Director K, for PriorGold Pictures, and it was released on the same day as the EP. As of April 2022, it has surpassed half a million views on YouTube.

Versions
2021: "Love Don't Cost A Dime"
2022: "Love Don't Cost A Dime (Re-Up)" (with. Ayra Starr) – 2:27

Charts

References 

Nigerian afropop songs
Nigerian rhythm and blues songs
2021 songs
2021 singles
Mavin Records singles
2022 songs
2022 singles